The Andalién River is a river in the province of Concepción, in the Bío Bío Region of Chile. It is one of the two rivers that bracket the city of Concepción.

Course
The Andalién River is formed by the union of the Poñén from the north and the Curapalihue from the south in the commune of Florida. It then flows southwest and west, and eventually northwest into the city of Concepción, Chile. After the city of Concepción, it flows north through the former villages (now neighbourhoods) of Andalién and El Rosal, and then the communes of Talcahuano, and Penco. There, on its alluvial plain northeast of Concepción, it forms distributaries, and small lakes, such as the Laguna Negra, before entering the Bay of Concepción.

See also
 Battle of Andalién

Notes and references

Sources 
 
 

Rivers of Chile
Rivers of Biobío Region